Eucalyptus caleyi, commonly known as Caley's ironbark or Ovenden's ironbark is a species of small to medium-sized tree, endemic to eastern Australia. It has brown or black "ironbark" on the trunk and main branches, dull bluish grey lance-shaped to egg-shaped adult leaves, flower buds in groups of seven, white flowers and barrel-shaped or conical fruit. It grows on the Central and Northern Tablelands of New South Wales and in south-eastern Queensland.

Description
It has rough, grey, brown or black "ironbark" on its trunk and branches. Flowering mainly occurs between September and November and the flowers are white.

Taxonomy
Eucalyptus caleyi was first formally described by Joseph Maiden in 1906 and the description was published in Volume 2 of his book The Forest Flora of New South Wales.

In 1991, Lawrie Johnson and Ken Hill described two subspecies:
 Eucalyptus caleyi subsp. caleyi that has rounded fruit;
 Eucalyptus caleyi subsp. ovendenii that has quadrangular fruit.

Subspecies caleyi has a number of synonyms.

The specific epithet (caleyi) honours George Caley and the epithet ovendenii honours Peter John Ovenden (1929–1997), a forester who first recognised the subspecies later named after him as distinct.

Distribution and habitat
Caley's ironbark grows on low hills, ridges and broad undulating valleys in dry forest and woodland. It grows from near Denman and the Goulburn River through the Northern Tablelands of New South Wales to the Millmerran area in south-eastern Queensland.

Ovenden's ironbark, (subspecies ovendenii) is restricted to more elevated sites to the west of Tenterfield.

See also
List of Eucalyptus species

References

caleyi
Flora of New South Wales
Flora of Queensland
Trees of Australia
Myrtales of Australia
Plants described in 1906
Taxa named by Joseph Maiden